The 1963 New York Yankees season was the 61st season for the team. The team finished with a record of 104–57, winning their 28th pennant, finishing 10½ games ahead of the Chicago White Sox. New York was managed by Ralph Houk.

The Yankees played at Yankee Stadium. In the World Series, they were defeated by the Los Angeles Dodgers in 4 games, the first time the Yankees had ever been swept in the World Series (they had lost 4 games to none with one tied game in 1922).

Offseason
 November 26, 1962: Bill Skowron was traded by the Yankees to the Los Angeles Dodgers for Stan Williams.

Regular season
Elston Howard became the first black player in the history of the American League to win the AL Most Valuable Player award.

Season standings

Record vs. opponents

Notable transactions
 April 29, 1963: Curt Blefary was selected off waivers from the Yankees by the Baltimore Orioles as a first-year waiver pick.

Roster

Player stats

Batting

Starters by position
Note: Pos = Position; G = Games played; AB = At bats; H = Hits; Avg. = Batting average; HR = Home runs; RBI = Runs batted in

Other batters
Note: G = Games played; AB = At bats; H = Hits; Avg. = Batting average; HR = Home runs; RBI = Runs batted in

Pitching

Starting pitchers
 Note: G = Games pitched; IP = Innings pitched; W = Wins; L = Losses; ERA = Earned run average; SO = Strikeouts

Other pitchers
Note: G = Games pitched; IP = Innings pitched; W = Wins; L = Losses; ERA = Earned run average; SO = Strikeouts

Relief pitchers
Note: G = Games pitched; W = Wins; L = Losses; SV = Saves; ERA = Earned run average; SO = Strikeouts

1963 World Series 

NL Los Angeles Dodgers (4) vs. AL New York Yankees (0)

Awards and honors
 Elston Howard, American League MVP
 Ralph Houk, Associated Press AL Manager of the Year

All-Stars 
All-Star Game
 Joe Pepitone, starter, first base
 Jim Bouton, reserve
 Elston Howard, reserve
 Bobby Richardson, reserve
 Tom Tresh, reserve
 Mickey Mantle, did not play (injured)

Farm system

LEAGUE CHAMPIONS: Augusta, Idaho Falls

Notes

References
1963 New York Yankees at Baseball Reference
1963 World Series
1963 New York Yankees team page at www.baseball-almanac.com

New York Yankees seasons
New York Yankees
New York Yankees
1960s in the Bronx
American League champion seasons